Simon Price (born 25 September 1967) is a British music journalist and author.  He is known for his weekly review section in The Independent on Sunday and his book Everything  (A Book About Manic Street Preachers).

Career

Writer
Price began his career on the Barry & District News, where he wrote a music column from 1984–1986.

In the 1990s, Price was a staff writer for the Melody Maker for nine years.

From 2000-2013, Price wrote weekly review section in The Independent on Sunday newspaper.

Everything, a biography of Manic Street Preachers, was claimed by Caroline Sullivan in The Guardian in 1999 to be the "fastest selling rock book of all time".  It was later listed by The Guardian in a Top Ten of books about rock.  Ben Myers, who wrote Richard, a novel about Manics guitarist Richey Edwards, called it "one of the most exhaustively researched and passionately written band biographies in existence".  Price disowned a 2002 re-issue of the book following a dispute over edits by the publisher, who cut criticisms of the police search for Richey Edwards.

Price won the Record of the Day Live Reviews: Writer of the Year awards in 2010, 2011 and 2012.

DJ and Club Promoter
Price was heavily involved with the Romo scene in the mid-1990s, about which he wrote extensively for Melody Maker, co-promoted the Arcadia clubnight and acted as DJ and tour manager for the Fiddling While Romo Burns Romo package tour.

In 2001, he co-created alternative "glam/rock/trash" nightclub "Stay Beautiful". Named after the Manic Street Preachers song, it drew heavily on the ethos and attitudes of the band. Having run for over 10 years in London the club relocated to Brighton in 2011, where it continued until 2016.

Since 2017, Price has been is running an alternative 1980s club called "Spellbound" in Brighton.

Other
Price has appeared on BBC radio and television stations as a pop expert.

He is a recurring contributor to the "Chart Music" podcast, revisiting classic Top of the Pops episodes.

Personal
The son of a radio presenter, Price attended Barry Comprehensive in Wales and studied French and philosophy at University College London.

Alongside 54 other signatories, Price put his name to an open letter published in The Guardian on 15 September 2010, stating their opposition to Pope Benedict XVI's state visit to the UK. He is also listed as a distinguished supporter of Humanists UK.

References

1967 births
Living people
British music critics
Melody Maker writers
Welsh journalists
Alumni of University College London
Romo